Aakhree Raasta is a 1986 Indian Hindi-language crime drama film written and directed by K. Bhagyaraj, presented by T. Rama Rao  and produced by A. Purnachandra Rao both under banner Lakshmi Productions (Madras) (P).LTD. The film stars Amitabh Bachchan in a dual role, Jaya Prada, Sridevi and Anupam Kher. It was directed by the Tamil actor and director K. Bhagyaraj. It was revealed by Sridevi herself in one of her interviews that actress Rekha lent her voice for her in this movie.

The film was a remake of the Tamil film Oru Kaidhiyin Diary which was also scripted by Bhagyaraj, but directed by Bharathiraja. 
This film was declared all-time blockbuster.

Synopsis
David D'Costa (Amitabh Bachchan) lives a relatively poor life in Madras (now Chennai) with his wife Mary D'Costa (Jaya Prada) who is pregnant. He literally worships the Member of Parliament Chaturvedi (Sadashiv Amrapurkar), and is even willing to die for him. He introduces Mary to Chaturvedi, and with his blessings they name the new-born son James. Then one day while he is busy obstructing rail traffic, he gets arrested and is bailed out by Mahesh (Anupam Kher) When he returns home he finds that Mary has committed suicide. She left a note blaming Chaturvedi for raping her. An upset David goes to confront Chaturvedi, is intercepted by Police Inspector Roop Kumar Sahay (Dalip Tahil) and Dr. Verma (Bharat Kapoor), the evidence is destroyed, and he is sentenced to 24 years in prison for Mary's murder. He asks his friend Mahesh to look after James in his long absence. Twenty-four years later, David is released, he goes to visit Mahesh and is shocked to find that Mahesh has changed, he is no longer a boot-legger, he now lives a wealthy life-style, he wants David to forget the past, and live with his CID Inspector son Vijay (also Amitabh Bachchan). David is devastated with this news, but is determined to avenge his wrongful conviction and Mary's death, so he sets about to kill his tormentors one by one - the only obstruction he faces is none other than Vijay who, unaware of David being his father, is out to protect the three people.

Cast

 Amitabh Bachchan as David D'Costa/James D'Costa aka Inspector Vijay Shandaliya (dual role) (father and son)
 Jaya Prada as Mary D'Costa (David's wife)
 Sridevi as Vinita Bhatnagar (Vijay's girlfriend) 
 Anupam Kher as Mahesh Shandilya
 Dalip Tahil as Inspector Roop Kumar Sahay
 Sadashiv Amrapurkar as Minister Chaturvedi
 Bharat Kapoor as Dr. Verma
 Om Shivpuri as Deputy Inspector General of Police Bhatnagar
 Viju Khote as Amarnath, Senior Inspector

Soundtrack
Anand Bakshi wrote the lyrics.

Home media

The DVD version of the film was released by IndiaWeekly under its own label.

In other media

The name of the character Aakhri Pasta from the Housefull film series is a pun on Aakhree Raasta.

References

External links
 

1986 films
1980s Hindi-language films
Films scored by Laxmikant–Pyarelal
Hindi remakes of Tamil films
Films directed by K. Bhagyaraj
Films shot in Ooty
Indian films about revenge
Uxoricide in fiction
Fictional portrayals of the Maharashtra Police
Hindi-language crime films